Dryoscopus is a genus of bird in the Malaconotidae or bushshrike family. Its members are known as puffbacks. The six species, all of fairly uniform appearance and habits, are native to various parts of sub-Saharan Africa. The name Dryoscopus is a compound Greek word: drus from the Greek word for "tree" and skopos, meaning "watcher or lookout".

Structure and habits
Puffbacks are small, active bushshrikes that show a superficial resemblance to boubous. They however display only rudimentary duetting, have red or reddish irides, are smaller and compact with bouncy flight, and display sexual dimorphism. Characteristically, the long, loose and pale feathers of the male bird's back and rump are puffed out conspicuously during display. At the same time he may fly about, calling loudly. Comparable habits are found in some related genera (cf. Bocagia, Bias, Lanioturdus, Batis and Dyaphorophyia).

They move about in pairs in the upper strata of trees (Pringle's excepting) and may join mixed-species flocks. They command a varied repertoire of explosive and fricative whistles, percussive clicking sounds, and harsh rasping, churring or tearing sounds. Three species have a rasping alarm call (cubla, senegalensis and pringlii), while the remaining three (gambensis, angolensis and sabini) have a stuttering alarm call. Wing fripping and bill snapping complement vocal communication. The nest is a neat compact cup in the general fashion of bushshrikes, but similar to those of shrike-flycatchers. Courtship feeding is present, and studied species are monogamous and single-brooded.

Relationships
DNA-DNA hybridization studies suggest that genus Tchagra is their closest relative, though biological traits also link them to Laniarius, shrike-flycatchers (i.e. Bias and Megabyas) and other genera.

Species
The genus contains the following six species:

Gallery

References

 
Bird genera
Taxonomy articles created by Polbot